Equinox Publishing may refer to:

 Equinox Publishing (Jakarta), a publisher of books on Indonesia 
 Equinox Publishing (Sheffield), an independent academic publisher based in Sheffield